James Steven Lewis (born July 20, 1964) is former Major League Baseball pitcher. He batted and threw right-handed.

External links

1964 births
Living people
Baseball players from Michigan
San Diego Padres players
Charleston Rainbows players
Las Vegas Stars (baseball) players
Reno Padres players
Riverside Red Wave players
Rochester Red Wings players
Spokane Indians players
Wichita Wranglers players
Citrus Owls baseball players